Vishnu Sree Institute of Technology (VSIT) is a technical college in Jalalpur village, Bommalaramaram, Nalgonda, Telangana, India, 25 km from ECIL, Hyderabad. VSIT is affiliated with Jawaharlal Nehru Technological University, Hyderabad and is approved by the All India Council of Technical Education New Delhi. The institute was founded in 2008.

The founder is Sri CH. Hanumantha Rao. Vishnu Sree Institute of Technology is now managed by CAL Public School Management.

The Chairman and Director of the institution is Shri. R.P. Seth who is a postgraduate from Bombay University with experience at the Bhabha Atomic Research Centre, ECIL.

The college is banned by the high court in Telangana because the college was not onto the standards of AICTE norms.

Academic programs

B-tech courses

Postgraduate courses

As of 2008, 300 students were offered undergraduate seats and 60 MBA seats. As of 2010, 360 students are offered undergraduate seats  through EAMCET and 60 MBA seats through ICET.

Departments
Graduate courses
Computer Science and Engineering
Electronics and Communication Engineering
Electrical and Electronics Engineering
Civil engineering

Postgraduate course
Master in Business Administration
Master of Technology

Principals
 Rp. Seth (director)

References

External links

 VEDAS
 Vishnu Sree official page

All India Council for Technical Education
Engineering colleges in Hyderabad, India
Educational institutions established in 2008
2008 establishments in Andhra Pradesh